The Ring of Fire Press was created in 2013 to release material in the 1632 series that was originally published as serials over successive issues of The Grantville Gazettes magazine.  Beginning in 2018, they had released original material in the 1632 series, and had published other works.

On August 16, 2022, Lucille Robbins, the widow of Eric Flint, officially announced the immediate shutdown of both The Grantville Gazette and the Ring of Fire Press. Without a huge infusion of new cash, it was determined that both business ventures would not be economically viable without Flint's participation. As a result, all titles are now out-of-print; ebook distribution had ceased, and the limited pre-existing stock of new paper editions at authorized retailers will disappear soon.

1632 books

Time Spike books
In October 2018, the Ring of Fire Press began releasing novels that are part of the Time Spike series that were previously published as serials in the Grantville Gazette.

Queen of the Seas books
In August 2021, the Ring of Fire Press began releasing novels that are part of the Queen of the Seas series.

Non-Assiti Shards books
In April 2017, the Ring of Fire Press began releasing novels that were not a part of either the 1632 or Assiti Shards book series.

References

External links

Ring of Fire Press
1632 series